Hartland is a census-designated place (CDP) comprising the main community in Hartland Township, in Livingston County, Michigan, United States. US Highway 23 forms the western edge of the community; the highway leads north  to Flint and south the same distance to Ann Arbor.

Hartland was first listed as a CDP prior to the 2020 census.

Demographics

References 

Census-designated places in Livingston County, Michigan
Census-designated places in Michigan
Unincorporated communities in Michigan
Unincorporated communities in Livingston County, Michigan